Brzeg Głogowski  is a village in the administrative district of Gmina Żukowice, within Głogów County, Lower Silesian Voivodeship, in south-western Poland. 

The village has a population of 500.

References

Villages in Głogów County